Azam Khan Durrani is a Pakistani politician, who is currently a member of the Khyber Pakhtunkhwa Assembly, belonging to the Jamiat Ulema-e-Islam (F). He was also elected as District Nazim bannu from 2005 to 2010. He is also serving as member of different committees in Khyber Pakhtunkhwa Assembly He is the son of Saad Ullah Khan DURRANI ( Father of democracy in bannu and first MPA from PF 58 bannu 1 ). He is the grandson of Khalifa Gul Nawaz DURRANI, who was a military commander with Haji Mir Zali Khan and fought many battles against British Empire.

Political career
Ali was elected as the member of the Khyber Pakhtunkhwa Assembly on ticket of Jamiat Ulema-e-Islam (F) from PK-70 (Bannu-I) in 2013 Pakistani general election.

References

Living people
Jamiat Ulema-e-Islam (F) politicians
Khyber Pakhtunkhwa MPAs 2013–2018
1968 births